The 2013 Chrono des Nations Women's Elite time trial was part of a series of one day time trials held at the end of the 2013 season. The tour has an UCI rating of 1.1. The race was won by  the Ukrainian Hanna Solovey.

It was announced that after winning the time trial at the 2013 UCI Road World Championships, world champion Ellen van Dijk would not start in this last time trial of the season.

Results

References

External links

 

2013 in women's road cycling
Chrono des Nations
2013 in French sport